Jeremy Dickson Paxman (born 11 May 1950) is an English broadcaster, journalist, author, and television presenter. Born in Leeds, Paxman was educated at Malvern College and St Catharine's College, Cambridge, where he edited the undergraduate newspaper Varsity. At Cambridge, he was a member of a Labour Party club and described himself as a socialist, in later life describing himself as a one-nation conservative. He joined the BBC in 1972, initially at BBC Radio Brighton, relocating to London in 1977. In following years, he worked on Tonight and Panorama, becoming a newsreader for the BBC Six O'Clock News and later a presenter on Breakfast Time.

In 1989, he became a presenter for the BBC Two programme Newsnight, interviewing many political figures. Paxman became known for his forthright interviewing style, particularly when interrogating politicians. These appearances were sometimes criticised as aggressive, intimidating and condescending, yet also applauded as tough and incisive. In 2014, Paxman left Newsnight after 25 years as its presenter. Since then, he has done occasional work for Channel 4 News. Since its revival in 1994, he has presented University Challenge and its Christmas spin-off from 2011 to 2022. In 2022, he announced he was standing down having been diagnosed with Parkinson's disease.

Early life and education

Paxman was born in Leeds, West Riding of Yorkshire, the son of steel company employee and former Royal Navy lieutenant and typewriter salesman (Arthur) Keith Paxman, who left the family and settled in Australia, and Joan McKay (née Dickson; 1920–2009). Keith Paxman's father was a worsted spinner, who became sufficiently prosperous as a travelling sales representative to send his son to public school in Bradford. The Dickson family were wealthier, with Keith's father-in-law, a self-made success, paying the Paxman children's school fees.

Paxman is the eldest of four children: one of his brothers, Giles Paxman, was the British Ambassador to Spain (having previously been ambassador to Mexico), and the other, James, is chief executive of the Dartmoor Preservation Association. His sister, Jenny, is a producer at BBC Radio.

Paxman was brought up in Hampshire, Bromsgrove, and Peopleton near Pershore in Worcestershire. He went to Malvern College in 1964, and later read English at St Catharine's College, Cambridge, where he edited the university student newspaper Varsity. While at Cambridge, Paxman was briefly a member of the Cambridge Universities Labour Club. He has since been made an honorary fellow of the College.

In January 2006, Paxman was the subject of an episode of the BBC genealogy series Who Do You Think You Are?. The documentary concluded that he was descended from Roger Packsman, a 14th-century politician from Suffolk who had changed his name to Paxman to impress the electorate (pax being Latin for 'peace'). Paxman's maternal grandmother was born in Glasgow, Scotland. The programme generated much publicity before its transmission by displaying him with tears in his eyes on camera when informed that his impoverished great-grandmother Mary McKay's poor relief had been revoked because she had a child out of wedlock.

Career

Journalism
Paxman joined the BBC's graduate trainee programme in 1972. He started in local radio, at BBC Radio Brighton. He moved to Belfast, where he reported on the Troubles. He moved to London in 1977. Two years later he transferred from the Tonight programme to Panorama. After five years reporting from places such as Beirut, Uganda and Central America, he read the Six O'Clock News for two years, before moving to BBC1's Breakfast Time programme.

Newsnight
Paxman became a presenter of Newsnight in 1989.

On 13 May 1997 he interviewed Michael Howard, who had been Home Secretary until 13 days earlier after he had held a meeting with Derek Lewis, head of Her Majesty's Prison Service, about the possible dismissal of the governor of Parkhurst Prison, John Marriott. Howard was asked by Paxman the same question  "Did you threaten to overrule him [Lewis]?"  a total of twelve times in succession (fourteen, if the first two inquiries worded somewhat differently and some time before the succession of twelve are included).

During a 20th anniversary edition of Newsnight in 2000, Paxman told Howard that he had simply been trying to prolong the interview because the next item in the running order was not ready.

In 1998, Denis Halliday, a United Nations Humanitarian Coordinator, resigned his post in Iraq, describing the effects of his own organisation's sanctions as genocide. Paxman asked Halliday in a Newsnight interview, "Aren't you just an apologist for Saddam Hussein?"

In February 2003, Paxman was criticised by the Broadcasting Standards Commission over a Newsnight interview in which he questioned the then Liberal Democrat leader Charles Kennedy about his drinking. The commission said that the questioning was "overly intrusive in nature and tone and had exceeded acceptable boundaries for broadcast".

In 2003, Prime Minister Tony Blair opted to make the case for the invasion of Iraq via questions from a TV studio audience, mediated by Paxman. The programme is chiefly remembered for the fact that Paxman asked Blair if he and U.S. President Bush prayed together. Blair replied, "No, Jeremy. We don't pray together." To which Paxman replied, "But why not?"

During the 2005 general election, some viewers complained to the BBC that Paxman's questioning of party leaders had been rude and aggressive. He was criticised for his 5 am interview with George Galloway after his election as the Respect MP for Bethnal Green and Bow by the just defeated Oona King. Paxman asked Galloway more than once whether he was proud of having got rid of "one of the very few black women in Parliament." Galloway cut the interview short. King later said she "did not wish to be defined, by either my ethnicity or religious background."

On 11 April 2012, Paxman interviewed Russell Brand about Brand's political views and the article he wrote for the New Statesman. The interview went viral as Brand stated that it was "futile" to vote and that a "political revolution" was needed. After this interview, Paxman revealed that he previously did not vote either.

On 26 June 2012, he interviewed the Economic Secretary to the Treasury Chloe Smith about Chancellor George Osborne's decision that day to delay plans to increase fuel duty. Paxman questioned the apparent change in her views on fuel duty. Senior politicians, including John Prescott, questioned Osborne's judgement for sending a junior minister onto the programme in place of himself.

The BBC announced Paxman's departure from Newsnight at the end of April 2014. He had told Lord Hall of Birkenhead, the Director General of the BBC, and James Harding, BBC Head of News, that he wished to leave in July 2013, but agreed to stay on Newsnight for another year after the programme had been damaged by the Savile and Lord McAlpine scandals. In his statement Paxman commented: "After 25 years, I should rather like to go to bed at much the same time as most people."

Paxman's brusque manner is not restricted to political interviews. When around 2005 Newsnights editor decided to broadcast brief weather forecasts instead of financial reports Paxman openly ridiculed the decision: "The forecast: it's April, what do you expect?" The financial reports were re-introduced after a few weeks.

Paxman presented his last Newsnight on 18 June 2014 in an edition which included an interview with Lord Mandelson and one with London Mayor Boris Johnson, while they both rode a tandem bicycle, as well as a brief reappearance of Michael Howard who, following on from his 1997 interview, was simply asked: "Did you?". The closing theme was replaced with I'd Like to Teach the World to Sing by The New Seekers. The programme ended with a brief post-credits scene with Paxman standing in front of a weather map exclaiming "Tomorrow's weather: more of the same! I don't know why they make such a fuss about it" in reference to the 2005 weather forecasts.

Other TV work
Paxman has presented the weekly TV programme review Did You See...?, You Decide and, since 1994, University Challenge, bringing him the distinction of "longest-serving current quizmaster on British TV." He presented a weekly compilation of highlights from the domestic edition of Newsnight from February 2008 until shortly after the 2008 U.S. election on BBC America and BBC World, when the American programme was cancelled. The programme is still aired on BBC World.

In April 2006, The Sun claimed that Paxman earned £800,000 for his Newsnight job and £240,000 for presenting University Challenge, bringing his TV earnings to a yearly total of £1,040,000. This was one of a series of BBC salary leaks in the tabloid press that prompted an internal BBC investigation.

Paxman appeared as himself in an episode of BBC comedy The Thick of It which aired in January 2007. He is seen grilling Junior Minister Ben Swain (played by Justin Edwards) in a disastrous Newsnight interview.

Beginning on 15 February 2009, his four-part documentary The Victorians was transmitted on BBC One. The series explores Victorian art and culture. From 27 February until 26 March 2012, BBC One broadcast Paxman's series Empire, examining the history and legacy of the British Empire.

In 2014, Paxman presented Britain's Great War, an accompaniment to his 2013 book Great Britain's Great War.

On 26 March 2015, Paxman co-presented, with Kay Burley, David Cameron and Ed Miliband Live: The Battle for Number 10, in which he interviewed both British Prime Minister David Cameron and Opposition Leader Ed Miliband regarding their track record in politics and their plans if elected Prime Minister in the general election set for May of that year. He also hosted Channel 4's Alternative Election Night with David Mitchell. He then later co-presented a similar programme with Faisal Islam, interviewing Jeremy Corbyn and Theresa May before the 2017 United Kingdom general election on 29 May, May v Corbyn Live: The Battle for Number 10.

In August 2022, it was announced that Paxman will be stepping down as host of the long-running student quiz show University Challenge after 29 years.

Books

Paxman's first book, A Higher Form of Killing (1982), written with then BBC colleague and friend Robert Harris, arose out of an edition of the Panorama programme they had made together on biological and chemical warfare. In a revised 2002 version they asserted that Iraq possessed chemical and biological weapons. In 1985, Paxman published Through the Volcanoes: A Central American Journey, an eyewitness account of people, places and politics. Friends in High Places: Who Runs Britain? (1991) was the result of numerous detailed interviews with the powerful or highly influential, what used to be called The Establishment. 1999 saw the publication of his The English: A Portrait of a People. The Political Animal: An Anatomy (2003), again based on extensive interviews, examines the motivations and methods of those who constitute the author's professional prey: Westminster politicians.

The otherwise-republican Paxman's On Royalty, which entailed the cooperation of Britain's Royal Family, became by the time it was published in 2006 a defence of the country's constitutional monarchy. His recent books have been big sellers. His book, The Victorians: Britain through the Paintings of the Age, published in 2009, was accompanied by a BBC documentary series. In his introduction, Paxman acknowledged that the Irish writer Neil Hegarty had played a significant role in editing the book and bringing it to completion. Paxman stated that since all television is a "collaborative exercise", it was "rather silly for this book – which accompanies a television series – to appear with only one name on the cover." Paxman's most recent book is a study of the British Empire, Empire: What Ruling the World Did to the British.

Paxman kept a detached tone while writing his memoir, A Life in Questions, which was published in October 2016.

Radio
Paxman presented the flagship BBC Radio 4 show Start the Week from 1998 to 2002.

Other positions 
Paxman is a Vice-President of The London Library.

Paxman and the BBC
While John Birt was Director General of the BBC, the British press from time to time reported Paxman's criticism of his boss. Birt was suspected at first to be an outsider brought in by a hostile government to supervise the BBC's break-up and ultimate sell-off. Birt then publicly questioned the confrontational approach of certain TV and radio interviewers. This was seen at the time as coded criticism of Paxman himself and of his BBC colleague John Humphrys.

On 24 August 2007, Paxman delivered the MacTaggart Memorial Lecture at the Edinburgh International Television Festival. In it he was critical of much of contemporary television in Britain. He expressed concern that as a consequence of recent production scandals the medium was "rapidly losing public trust". Speaking of prime minister Tony Blair's criticism of the mass media at the time he left office, Paxman asserted that, though often, press and broadcasting may be "oppositional" in relation to the government of the day, this "could only benefit democracy". "Those Reithian goals, to 'inform, educate and entertain,' still remained valid". Paxman took the opportunity to dismiss as "inaccurate" the attribution to him, which was in fact, Louis Heren, of the oft-quoted "Why is this lying bastard lying to me?" as the supposed dominant thought in his mind when interviewing senior politicians. He called on the television industry to "rediscover a sense of purpose".

In November 2012, Paxman publicly defended George Entwistle following his resignation as Director-General of the BBC in connection with a Newsnight report which falsely implicated Lord McAlpine in the North Wales child abuse scandal. Paxman claimed Entwistle had been "brought low by cowards and incompetents" and criticised appointments of "biddable people" to the BBC in the wake of the Hutton Inquiry, as well as cuts to BBC programme budgets and bloated BBC management.

In August 2013, Paxman appeared on Newsnight with a beard, causing a Twitter trend when he accused the BBC of having an aversion to beards.

Awards and honours
In 1996 Paxman received BAFTA's Richard Dimbleby Award for "outstanding presenter in the factual arena." Two years later he won the Royal Television Society's Interviewer of the Year Award for his Newsnight interview (see above) with Michael Howard, as well as the Broadcasting Press Guild's award for best "non-acting" performer. He gained another Richard Dimbleby Award in 2000 and was nominated for the award in 2001 and 2002. In total, Paxman has won five Royal Television Society awards. He won the award for International Current Affairs in 1985, and TV journalism interviewer/presenter of the year four times (1997, 1998, 2001 and 2008).

Paxman was given an honorary doctorate by the University of Leeds in the summer of 1999 and in December that year received an honorary degree from the University of Bradford. In 2006 he received an honorary doctorate from the Open University. Among those at the ceremony were three members of the Open University's 1999 University Challenge team. Paxman is a Fellow by special election of St Edmund Hall, Oxford, and an Honorary Fellow of his alma mater, St. Catharine's College, Cambridge. In July 2016, Paxman was awarded an honorary degree from the University of Exeter for achievements in the field of broadcasting and journalism.

Personal life

Paxman formerly lived with TV producer Elizabeth Clough in Stonor, southeast Oxfordshire. They have three children. The couple, who did not marry, amicably separated in 2016 after 35 years together. He prefers to keep his private life "out of the spotlight" and says he is not interested in the private lives of others. He has a flat in Kensington, London.

Paxman supports Leeds United FC and enjoys fly fishing. He is vice-chairman of the Wild Trout Trust conservation charity. He is also a patron of the charity Sustrans and east London homeless charity Caritas Anchor House.

In his twenties, Paxman unsuccessfully applied for the vacant editorship of the Labour-supporting weekly, the New Statesman; he said that in his youth he considered himself a socialist. He had previously stood as a communist candidate in his school elections. More recently, he has been described as "the archetypal floating voter", and Jon Snow once said that Paxman's greatest strength was being "not very political". In 2014, Paxman described himself as a one-nation conservative. Elsewhere, Paxman has stated that he has no dominant political ideology:

In June 2014, Paxman, speaking at the Chalke Valley History Festival about his new book, Britain's Great War, complained that Newsnight was made by idealistic "13-year-olds" who foolishly thought they could "change the world". "Look, Newsnight is made by 13-year-olds. It's perfectly normal when you're young that you want to change the world," Paxman said. "The older you get, the more you realise what a fools' errand much of that is and that the thing to do is to manage the best you can to the advantage of as many people as possible." Speaking about his political views in general, he said he was "in favour of governments getting out of people's lives – particularly foreign government", saying Europe had been "nothing but trouble for us". He also joked that Belgium was a "pointless little country". "The closer you can take decision-making to the people affected by those decisions, the better."
In 2019, in an interview with 60 Minutes on Australia's Nine Network, Paxman said he voted remain in the 2016 United Kingdom European Union membership referendum (initially intending to vote leave), but believed the result had to be respected:

Paxman became a focus of media attention in October 2000 when a German Enigma machine, which had been stolen from Bletchley Park Museum, was inexplicably sent to him in the post. He returned it to the museum.

In an interview with Emily Dean on a Times Radio podcast, Paxman described his experience with depression. He said that he takes psychiatric medication and has undergone cognitive behavioural therapy. He stated that he regularly walks his dog, Derek, which "helps as he meets people", and that his dog "makes him laugh".

In September 2021, whilst promoting his book Black Gold: The History of How Coal Made Britain, Paxman revealed his support for Scottish independence. Talking to The Sunday Times, he said, "My view about the Union is that if there is to be a referendum then the English should be allowed a vote as well. We are supposedly a nation of equals, so we should be equally entitled to a vote. And although I am a quarter Scottish I would vote to separate, I think. Because I can't see what is gained by persistently giving the Jocks an excuse. We're always going to be friends."

Paxman revealed in May 2021 that he is receiving treatment for Parkinson's disease, describing his symptoms as "mild". Shan Nicholas of Parkinson's UK said, "Previously, Jeremy pledged to donate his brain to the Parkinson's UK Brain Bank which will, one day, help scientists uncover the discoveries that will lead to better treatments and a cure for Parkinson's."

In October 2022 an ITV documentary, Paxman: Putting Up With Parkinson's, revealed how the disease has impacted him – the programme showed him attending a ballet class, learning to play bowls, meeting experts and observing a brain dissection. He met Sharon Osbourne, the wife of fellow Parkinson's sufferer Ozzy Osbourne, to discuss the role of a partner or family carer; he agreed to her suggestion to one day try cannabidiol oil to relieve the symptoms of Parkinson's. The programme revealed that Paxman recorded his very last episode of University Challenge on 15 October 2022.

Criticism
Paxman was publicly criticised over his and his former partner's home help arrangements. Having advertised on a Romanian website, they hired two people at below the minimum wage without a written contract. This was not illegal in the UK if employees live in, though Paxman was criticised when his employees went public, claiming to have been paid "the bare minimum".

Paxman's controversial remarks about Scottish people provoked anger at parliamentary level. Twenty Scottish MPs signed a House of Commons motion in March 2005 condemning him for comparing supposed Scottish dominance at Westminster to British rule in India: a "Scottish Raj" was running the UK, said Paxman. The group of Scottish MPs described Paxman's views as "insulting, irresponsible, divisive and snobbish". The row came after a Cabinet minister had complained that Paxman had been offensive about his Glasgow accent. In an introduction to a new edition of Chambers Dictionary in August 2008, Paxman labelled the work of Scotland's national poet Robert Burns as "sentimental doggerel". Paxman himself is quarter-Scottish through his maternal grandmother, a fact which he stated has led to many of his comments being misunderstood as he regards the Scots "with affection".

Paxman was criticised as "disrespectful" when commenting on the possible exit of Greece from the Eurozone on an edition of Newsnight on 31 May 2012. Paxman said that Greece, "like a bad kebab", faced the possibility of being "vomited out of the single currency". Greek minister Giorgos Papakonstantinou complained that the 'bad kebab' analogy was offensive.

In November 2013, while being interviewed by Graham Norton, Paxman called Prime Minister David Cameron an idiot and admitted that he had not voted in his last local election. Nick Clegg, the deputy prime minister, later criticised his "sneering" attitude to politics and accused Paxman of treating politicians as "rogues and charlatans". He said Paxman profited handsomely from politics through his television work but did not involve himself in the political process.

John Pilger has flagged-up Paxman's membership of the British-American Project in the context of political biases of mainstream media.

Paxman was criticised for his presentation of the BBC documentary Britain's Great War. While describing how British conscientious objectors were jailed and threatened with the death penalty because killing was against their beliefs, Paxman ventured his own opinion that it was the objectors themselves who were at fault, and that they were "extreme". The conscientious objectors, Paxman said, "have always struck me as cranks".

In 2017, Paxman's interviews of Jeremy Corbyn and Theresa May for the upcoming general election were described by journalist Michael Deacon as "embarrassing". Deacon opined that Paxman's pugilistic style of questioning had become tired, claiming that he had been "doing an impression of himself".

Bibliography
 New edition published as 

The 20th Century Day by Day (Foreword by Jeremy Paxman)

Gulliver's Travels by Jonathan Swift (Introduction by Jeremy Paxman)

References

External links

 Biography of Jeremy Paxman, member of the BBC's Press Office, at the official website of the BBC.
 BBC 'Newsnight' biography of Jeremy Paxman
Official website of BBC's Newsnight programme
 Paxman questioned by fellow-journalists at London's Frontline Club, February 2008
 Paxman interviewed at length on the US Charlie Rose Show, June 2007

1950 births
Living people
Alumni of St Catharine's College, Cambridge
BBC newsreaders and journalists
BBC World News
Channel 4 presenters
English game show hosts
English historians
English male journalists
English memoirists
English people of Scottish descent
English reporters and correspondents
English television presenters
Fellows of St Edmund Hall, Oxford
Panorama (British TV programme)
People educated at Malvern College
People from Leeds
Television personalities from West Yorkshire
University Challenge